Admiral William Feilding, 1st Earl of Denbigh (c. 15878 April 1643, Cannock) was an English naval officer and courtier.

Biography

William Feilding was the son of Basil Fielding of Newnham Paddox in Warwickshire (High Sheriff of Warwickshire in 1612) and of Elizabeth, daughter of Sir Walter Aston (1530–1599) and his wife, Elizabeth (née Leveson).

Feilding matriculated at Queens' College, Cambridge in 1603. In 1606 Feilding married Susan, daughter of Sir George Villiers and sister of George Villiers, who became the favourite of King James I and was made Duke of Buckingham. With the rise of (the younger) George Villiers, both William and Susan received various offices and dignities.

Knighted on 4 March 1607, William Feilding was created Baron and Viscount Feilding in 1620. Two years later he was appointed Master of the Great Wardrobe and Custos Rotulorum of Warwickshire and Earl of Denbigh on 14 September 1622. He attended Prince Charles on the Spanish adventure, served as admiral in the unsuccessful Cadiz Expedition in 1625, and commanded the disastrous attempt upon Rochelle in 1628, becoming the same year a member of the Council of war, and in 1633 a Member of the Council of Wales and the Marches. In 1631, Lord Denbigh visited the East as erstwhile ambassador to the court of Safi of Persia as well as toured the East India Company's fledgling Indian possessions.

On 6 July 1641 a barge carrying Feilding, his daughter Elizabeth, Lady Kinalmeaky, Lady Cornwallis, and Anne Kirke capsized while shooting the rapids at London Bridge. Kirke was drowned but the other passengers were rescued.

On the outbreak of the English Civil War he served under Prince Rupert of the Rhine and was present at the Battle of Edgehill. On 3 April 1643 during Rupert's attack on Birmingham he was wounded and died from the effects on the 8th, being buried at Monks Kirby in Warwickshire. His courage, unselfishness and devotion to duty are much praised by Edward Hyde, Earl of Clarendon.

Family
Sir William and his wife, Susan Villiers, had six children:

 Basil Feilding, 2nd Earl of Denbigh (c. 1608–1675)
 George Feilding, 1st Earl of Desmond (c. 1614–1665)
 Mary (1613–1638), married James Hamilton, 1st Duke of Hamilton.
 Lady Anne (died 1636), married Baptist Noel, 3rd Viscount Campden 
 Lady Elizabeth, Countess of Guildford (died 1667), married Lewis Boyle, 1st Viscount Boyle. 
 Henrietta Marie (died young)

His daughter, Lady Margaret Feilding (1613–1638), also known as Mary, was married to James Hamilton, 1st Duke of Hamilton, one of the heirs to the throne of Scotland after the descendants of James VI (James I of England). Her portrait was painted by Anthony van Dyck and Henry Pierce Bone. His eldest son, Basil, inherited the title of Earl of Denbigh. His second son, George Feilding, was awarded the right to the title of Earl of Desmond at the same time as his father was made Earl of Denbigh in 1622. George Feilding was around eight years old at the time. Earl of Desmond was a lesser title than Earl of Denbigh, being a title in the Irish, rather than English, peerage.

Ancestry

Notes

References

External links

1643 deaths
1580s births
16th-century English nobility
17th-century English nobility
People from Warwickshire
William
17th-century Royal Navy personnel
Alumni of Queens' College, Cambridge
Cavaliers
Earls of Denbigh
Royal Navy admirals
Knights Bachelor